Mega Millions (originally known as The Big Game in 1996 and renamed, temporarily, to The Big Game Mega Millions six years later) is an American multijurisdictional lottery game; as of January 30, 2020, it is offered in 45 states, the District of Columbia, and the U.S. Virgin Islands. The first (The Big Game) Mega Millions drawing was in 2002. What is now Mega Millions initially was offered in six states; the logo for all versions of the game following the retirement of The Big Game name featured a gold-colored ball with six stars to represent the game's initial membership, although some lotteries insert their respective logos in the ball.

Mega Millions is drawn at 11 pm Eastern Time on Tuesday and Friday evenings, including holidays. Mega Millions is administered by a consortium of its 12 original lotteries; the drawings are held at the studios of WSB-TV in Atlanta, Georgia, supervised by the Georgia Lottery. The hosts are John Crow, Carol Blackmon and Adrian Wollford.

Under the current version's regulations (which began October 28, 2017, with the first drawing October 31) for Mega Millions, the minimum Mega Millions advertised jackpot is $20 million, paid in 30 graduated yearly installments, increasing 5% each year (unless the cash option is chosen; see below for differences by lotteries on cash/annuity choice regulations). The jackpot increases when no top-prize winner results.

Reflecting common practice among American lotteries, the jackpot is advertised as a nominal value of annual installments. A cash-value option (the usual choice), when chosen by a jackpot winner, pays the approximate present value of the installments. Mega Millions' previous format began on October 19, 2013; its first drawing was three days later. In the current version of Mega Millions, five white balls are drawn from a pool of 70, and one gold-colored "MegaBall" is drawn from a separate pool of 25; a player must match all six numbers to win the jackpot.

Each game costs $2. Of the 47 Mega Millions jurisdictions, all but California offer an option, called "Megaplier" (plays with the Megaplier are $3 each) where nonjackpot prizes are multiplied by 2, 3, 4, or 5. The Megaplier was made available to all Mega Millions jurisdictions in January 2011; it began as an option available only in Texas. Several of the game's members offer the Just the Jackpot option, in which two plays cost $3. Only the jackpot can be won; none of the lower-tier prizes are available on such a wager.

The largest winning jackpot in Mega Millions history was $1.537 billion, for the October 23, 2018, drawing, in which a single winning jackpot ticket was sold in South Carolina. The winner anonymously claimed the prize in March 2019.

The 2010 expansion of Mega Millions and Powerball

On October 13, 2009, the Mega Millions consortium and Multi-State Lottery Association (MUSL) reached an agreement in principle to cross-sell Mega Millions and Powerball in American lottery jurisdictions, with the two groups referred to as the "Mega Power Lottery" by many users. The expansion occurred on January 31, 2010, as 23 Powerball members began selling Mega Millions tickets for their first drawing on February 2, 2010; likewise, 10 Mega Millions members began selling Powerball tickets for their first drawing the next day. Montana (joining Mega Millions on March 1, 2010) was the first jurisdiction to add either game after the cross-sell expansion. Nebraska (March 20, 2010), Oregon (March 28, 2010), Arizona (April 18, 2010), Maine (May 9, 2010), Coloradom and South Dakota (the latter two on May 16, 2010) also have joined Mega Millions since the expansion.

As of January 2020, 47 lotteries were offering Mega Millions and Powerball; Florida joined Mega Millions in May 2013. (Puerto Rico, whose lottery began in the 1930s, currently does not offer Mega Millions.) Mississippi began selling lottery tickets in 2019; it joined Mega Millions on January 30, 2020.

Before the agreement, the only stores that sold Mega Millions and Powerball tickets were retailers whose businesses were on a border between jurisdictions and sold competing games.

The current Mega Millions format began in October 2017. Plays are $2 per game. For an additional $1 per play, the Megaplier, if activated, multiplies nonjackpot prizes. Multipliers are 2, 3, 4, and 5 (a second-prize Megaplier play can win $5 million cash). The Megaplier is not available in California, or on Just the Jackpot wagers (where offered).

Current Mega Millions members

Mega Millions and Powerball

Alabama, Alaska, Hawaii, Nevada, and Utah do not sell lottery tickets. In 2013, Wyoming became the 44th state to establish a lottery; the next year, it began, initially offering both Mega Millions and Powerball. (In August 2018, a bill establishing a lottery in Mississippi was passed, and sent to its governor for his signature; its lottery began November 25, 2019, with Mississippi joining Mega Millions on January 30, 2020.)

In most cases, a lottery joining Mega Millions on or after January 31, 2010, offered Powerball before the MUSL cross-sell expansion.

History

The Big Game

Tickets for The Big Game began to be sold in Georgia, Illinois, Maryland, Massachusetts, Michigan, and Virginia on August 31, 1996. The Big Game was created and designed by Michigan Lottery Commissioner Bill Martin and Illinois Lottery Director Desiree Rogers after having discussions regarding a multistate game with lottery directors Rebecca Paul of the Georgia Lottery and Penelope W. Kyle of the Virginia Lottery. The Big Game initially was drawn weekly, on Friday.

The Georgia Lottery was a member of MUSL at the time and wanted to sell both games for the remainder of 1996,but within a few days, Georgia was forcibly removed from MUSL, returning with the 2010 cross-selling expansion.

Beginning in January 1999, jackpot winners were given the option to receive their prize in cash. In May 1999, New Jersey joined The Big Game, the only jurisdiction to enter as a participant before The Big Game became Mega Millions in 2002.

The Big Game Mega Millions
 Ohio and New York joined The Big Game consortium on May 15, 2002, when the game was renamed The Big Game Mega Millions, temporarily retaining the old name and the original "gold ball" logo. The "Big Money Ball" became the "Mega Ball". While the game's name was altered, the yellow ball in the new Mega Millions logo continued to read "The Big Game" until February 2003, after which it was replaced with six stars representing the original members of the consortium. The first  (The Big Game) Mega Millions drawing was held two days later, on May 17. The Mega Millions trademark is owned by the Illinois Lottery. The first three lotteries to join Mega Millions were Washington (in September 2002), Texas (in 2003), and California (in 2005); California was the last addition to Mega Millions before the cross-sell expansion of 2010. Montana joined Mega Millions on March 1, 2010, the first addition to Mega Millions after the cross-sell expansion.

When Texas joined Mega Millions in 2003, it began offering an option, initially available only to Texas Lottery players, known as the Megaplier, which was similar to Powerball's Power Play. The 11 Mega Millions lotteries without Megaplier on the January 31, 2010, cross-selling date gradually added the multiplier option; by January 2011, all Mega Millions lotteries, except for California, offered the Megaplier. The Texas Lottery owns the trademark to Megaplier.

On June 24, 2005, to commemorate California joining Mega Millions, that night's drawing was held in Hollywood, with Carrie Underwood assisting host Glenn Burns for the draw.

For the November 15, 2005, drawing, a group called "The Lucky 7" held the only jackpot-winning ticket, purchased in Anaheim, California, winning $315 million. They chose the cash option, splitting $175 million before tax was withheld.

On March 6, 2007, the Mega Millions jackpot reached $390 million, which was then the third-largest jackpot in U.S. history. The jackpot was shared by two tickets, both matching the numbers of 16–22–29–39–42 and Mega Ball 20. Both winners chose the cash option, with each share $116,557,083 before tax was withheld.

2010 cross-sell expansion
The New Jersey Lottery, among others, in early 2009 announced it would seek permission to sell Powerball tickets alongside Mega Millions. In October 2009, an agreement between Mega Millions and MUSL allowed all U.S. lotteries, including New Jersey's, to offer both games. On January 31, 2010, Mega Millions expanded to include the 23 MUSL members; as of that date, 35 jurisdictions were participating in Mega Millions. On the same day, 10 existing Mega Millions-participating lotteries began selling Powerball tickets. Ohio joined Powerball on April 16, 2010. On March 1, 2010, Montana became the first MUSL member to add Mega Millions after the cross-sell expansion. Nebraska became the 37th Mega Millions participating member on March 20, 2010, followed by Oregon as the 38th member on March 28, Arizona as the 39th member on April 18, and Maine as 40th Mega Millions participant on May 9, 2010. Colorado and South Dakota added Mega Millions on May 16, 2010, bringing the total to 42 jurisdictions.

Recent additions to Mega Millions included the U.S. Virgin Islands, in October 2010, and Louisiana in November 2011. Florida joined Mega Millions on May 15, 2013; the first drawing to include Florida-bought tickets was two days later.

Presumably due to their experience with the Power Play option for Powerball, all 23 lotteries joining Mega Millions on January 31, 2010, immediately offered Megaplier to their players. The Megaplier continues to be drawn by Texas Lottery computers, as California does not offer the multiplier. Montana, offering Powerball before the expansion date, became the 24th lottery to offer the Megaplier, followed by Nebraska (the 25th), Oregon (the 26th), Arizona (as the 27th) and Maine (as the 28th lottery to offer the option). After Colorado and South Dakota joined Mega Millions, the number of lotteries offering the Megaplier rose to 37.

Mega Millions tickets bought with the Megaplier option, beginning September 12, 2010, automatically won $1 million (instead of $250,000) if the five white balls – but excluding the Mega Ball – are matched.

On March 13, 2010, New Jersey became the first Mega Millions participant (just before the cross-sell expansion) to produce a jackpot-winning ticket for Powerball after joining that game. The ticket was worth over $211 million annuity (the cash option was chosen). On May 28, 2010, North Carolina became the first Powerball member (just before the cross-selling expansion) to produce a jackpot-winning Mega Millions ticket after joining Mega Millions, with an annuity jackpot of $12 million.

In January 2012, Mega Millions' rival Powerball was altered; among the changes were a price increase of $1 for each play, as a result, a base game costs $2, or $3 with the Power Play option. At the time, there were no plans to change the price of a Mega Millions play, with or without the Megaplier (see below for the 2017 format change that includes the base price for a Mega Millions play to be raised to $2). The price increase for playing Powerball was a major factor in Louisiana deciding to pursue joining Mega Millions, as that state's lottery joined Mega Millions on November 16, 2011.

October 2013 format change
The final 5/56 + 1/46 Mega Millions drawing was held on October 18, 2013; that night's jackpot of $37 million was not won. The first drawing under the revised 5/75 + 1/15 format—which saw the jackpot estimate "leap" to $55 million due to the change in the annuity structure—occurred on October 22, 2013. The minimum jackpot was then $15 million, with rollovers of at least $5 million. Second prize (5+0) became $1 million cash. In the revised format, players chose 5 of 75 white ball numbers, and the "Gold Ball" number out of 15.

The Megaplier option remained; the 5 multiplier was added.

Lower prize tiers (through October 18, 2013) based on a $1 play:
Match 5+0: $250,000
Match 4+MB: $10,000
Match 4+0: $150
Match 3+MB: $150
Match 3+0: $7
Match 2+MB: $10
Match 1+MB: $3
Match 0+MB: $2

Payouts in California remained parimutuel.

The odds of winning or sharing a Mega Millions jackpot (October 19, 2013 – October 27, 2017): one in about 258.9 million. The overall odds of winning a prize were one in 14.71, including the base $1 prize for a "Mega Ball"-only match.

Prizes and odds (2013–2017 version) based on a $1 play:
5 numbers plus the Mega Ball (5+1): Jackpot; 1 in 258,890,850
5 numbers but not the Mega Ball (5+0): $1,000,000; $1 in 17,259,390
4+1: $5,000; 1 in 739,688 
4+0: $500; 1 in 52,835
3+1: $50; 1 in 10,720
3+0: $5; 1 in 766
2+1: $5; 1 in 473
1+1: $2; 1 in 56
Mega Ball only: $1; 1 in 21

The odds for winning the $1 prize, 1 in 21, reflected the possibility of matching none of the white balls, but matching the Mega Ball.

The annuity—which was 20 annual payments (no cash option was available) when The Big Game began—changed from 26 equal yearly installments to 30 graduated annual payments (increasing 5 percent yearly) with the format change on October 19, 2013.

October 2017 format/price point change
On October 28, 2017, the price of a Mega Millions play doubled, to $2; the first drawing under the current price point was October 31, 2017. The Mega Millions double matrix changed, from 5/75 + 1/15 to the current 5/70 + 1/25. The starting jackpot became $40 million, with minimum rollovers of $5 million. The "Megaplier" option (which again is not offered in California) was retained, with an adjustment to its multipliers. (The final jackpot for the $1 version was $30 million, which was not won; the initial jackpot for the new version would still be $40 million with a jackpot hit.)

Mega Millions' non-California prize tiers effective October 28, 2017 (old prizes in parentheses; changed amounts in boldface) for a $2 base play:

 5+MB: Jackpot; starting jackpot raised to $40 million (annuity value)
 5+0: $1,000,000 ($1,000,000)
 4+MB: $10,000 ($5,000)
 4+0: $500 ($500)
 3+MB: $200 ($50)
 3+0: $10 ($5)
 2+MB: $10 ($5)
 1+MB: $4 ($2)
 0+MB: $2 ($1)

The new prize structure allocates roughly 75 percent of the prize pool for the jackpot; this is, in part, to facilitate the new Just the Jackpot option. The 2013–2017 version allocated about 68 percent towards the jackpot.

"Just the Jackpot" option

In preparation for the October 28, 2017, format change the then-46 Mega Millions members were given the choice of offering a $3, two-game play (called "Just the Jackpot"). A player choosing this option is not eligible for any of the eight lower-tier prizes; therefore, the Megaplier option is not available for Just the Jackpot wagers.

These lotteries offered the "Just the Jackpot" option upon the format change: Georgia, Indiana, Kansas, Massachusetts, Nebraska, New Jersey, New Mexico, New York, Ohio, South Dakota, Texas, Virginia, Wisconsin, and Wyoming. Kentucky has since added "Just the Jackpot", with other lotteries potentially adding it. Not known is whether a second series of playslips would be printed for lotteries offering "Just the Jackpot" beginning after the October 28, 2017, format change.

"Just the Jackpot" wagers and regular Mega Millions plays are printed on separate tickets. Most Just the Jackpot wagers are terminal-generated; however, JtJ wagers in Kansas and Texas allow the player to choose their numbers, while Wisconsin players must ask for a terminal-generated ticket.

As of January 2020, there has yet to be a jackpot winner from a Just the Jackpot wager; there also is no known count of JtJ wagers that would have won second prize (5+0) with a traditional Mega Millions play.

2020 adjustments to jackpot starting point and rollover due to COVID-19
On April 7, 2020, the Mega Millions starting jackpot amount was temporarily reset from $40 million to $20 million with the annuity option, with at least a $2 million rollover for each drawing without a jackpot winner, due to the COVID-19 pandemic in the United States. This was done to enforce social distancing and discourage crowding of selling venues for large jackpots, and to account for lower interest rates.

Record jackpots
The largest Mega Millions jackpot, $1.537 billion, was won on October 23, 2018, by one ticket, sold in South Carolina. This prize, the largest for one set of numbers in world history, was the second-largest lottery payout, behind Powerball's $2.04 billion jackpot won on November 10, 2022, by a single ticket. The record Mega Millions jackpot was claimed on March 5, 2019, with the winner choosing to remain anonymous under South Carolina law.

The second-largest Mega Millions jackpot worth $1.35 billion was won following the January 13, 2023 drawing, in which one winning ticket was sold in Maine.

The third-largest Mega Millions jackpot worth $1.34 billion was won following the July 29, 2022, drawing, in which one winning ticket was sold in Illinois.

The fourth-largest Mega Millions jackpot advertised as $640 million at the time of the drawing (annuitized) or $462 million (cash value), was drawn on March 30, 2012. The initial estimate for that drawing (following the March 27 drawing, which was $363 million annuity) was $476 million (later increased to $500 million and again to $540 million); brisk ticket sales pushed the jackpot values, both annuitized (to $656 million) and the cash option ($474 million) higher. The amount spent on Mega Millions for drawings following its previous jackpot win, on January 24, 2012, was at least $1.5 billion. three jackpot-winning tickets had been confirmed (Illinois, Kansas, and Maryland).

Mega Millions' fith-largest jackpot, $648 million (second-largest won), was for the December 17, 2013, drawing. Two winning tickets, one each from California and Georgia, were sold. The holder of the Georgia ticket claimed the next morning; they selected the cash option, which amounted to $173,819,742.50 before withholdings. The holder of the California ticket claimed on January 3, 2014. (The California ticket holder received an equal share, but potentially a larger cash-option amount, as California lottery winnings are exempt from state income tax.)

The July 24, 2018, drawing produced the sixth-largest jackpot (pending the larger one on offer the following October). The annuity value was $543 million, but the holders of the winning ticket, 11 co-workers at a Wells Fargo branch in San Jose, chose to split the $320 million cash lump sum.

Mega Millions' seventh-largest jackpot, $540 million, was for the July 8, 2016, drawing. One ticket from Indiana won the jackpot; the winner chose the cash option.

Mega Millions' eighth-largest jackpot, $533 million, was for the March 30, 2018, drawing. One ticket from New Jersey won the jackpot; Riverdale Lukoil South Gas Station sold the winning ticket.

Mega Millions' ninth-largest jackpot, $451 million, was for the January 5, 2018, drawing. The winner was Shane Missler of Port Richey, Florida.

Mega Millions' tenth-largest jackpot annuity value ($390 million) was for the March 6, 2007, drawing. Two tickets, one each from Georgia and New Jersey, won $195 million (annuity value) each. The holders of each ticket also chose the cash option.

Versions of (The Big Game) Mega Millions
Versions of The Big Game and Mega Millions have used different matrices:

Megaplier
Mega Millions players have the option to activate a multiplier, called Megaplier, in 46 of its 47 jurisdictions; it is functionally similar to Powerball's Power Play; except the latter limits the second-prize multiplier to 2x. (Neither Megaplier nor Power Play are offered in California because its state penal code distinguishes between a "lottery" in which the bank cannot be "broken", and a "banked game" whose bank theoretically could be broken; only a "lottery" was authorized by the state Lottery Act.) By adding $1 to a basic Mega Millions game, to $3, a player has an opportunity to multiply any non-jackpot prize by 2, 3, 4, or 5. The Megaplier is drawn by the Texas Lottery (before the cross-sell expansion on January 31, 2010, it was the only lottery to offer Megaplier), it is drawn by a random number generator (RNG). The odds for each Megaplier possibility are not uniform.

Megaplier wagers made for drawings from September 12, 2010, through October 18, 2013, that won second prize (then $250,000) were automatically elevated to 4x, winning $1 million. This "guarantee" did not carry over to the following version of Mega Millions, although the $1 million second prize became $5 million if the Megaplier is 5x.

Winning and probability

Former Mega Millions odds (October 19, 2013 – October 27, 2017):

The probability and odds can be taken into a mathematical perspective: The probability of winning the jackpot (through October 27, 2017) was 1:(75C5) x (15); that is: 75 ways for the first white ball times 74 ways for the second times 73 for the third times 72 for the fourth times 71 for the last white ball divided by 5 x 4 x 3 x 2 x 1, or 5!, and this number is then multiplied by 15 (15 possible numbers for the "Megaball"). Therefore, (75 x 74 x 73 x 72 x 71)/(5 x 4 x 3 x 2 x 1) x 15 = 258,890,850, which means any combination of five white balls plus the Megaball has a 1:258,890,850 chance of winning the jackpot. Similarly, the odds for second prize were 1:(75C5) x (15/14) = 1: 18,492,204 chance of winning. The overall probability of winning any prize was 1 in 14.7. If there are no jackpot winners for a specific drawing, the jackpot will keep increasing; however, the odds will still remain the same.

Payouts through October 18, 2013:

Overall probabilities: 1 in 755 of winning any of the top six prizes, 1 in 40 of winning any prize.

In California, prize levels are paid on a parimutuel basis, rather than the fixed lower-tier amounts for winners in other Mega Millions jurisdictions. California's eight lower-tier Mega Millions prize pools are separate from those shared by the other 45 lotteries. California's second prize is a "secondary jackpot"; its payout sometimes exceeds $1 million cash, even though California does not offer the Megaplier.

Payment options and claiming prizes
In New Jersey and Texas lotteries, players must choose, in advance, whether they wish to collect a jackpot prize in cash or annuity. New Jersey winners can change an annuity ticket to cash should they be eligible to claim a jackpot, but the choice is binding in Texas.
The other Mega Millions members allow the cash/annuity choice to be made after winning (usually 60 days after claiming the ticket), although in Florida, the 60-day "clock" starts with the drawing in which the jackpot prize was won.

If a jackpot prize is not claimed within the respective jurisdiction's time limit, each of the 46 Mega Millions members gets back the money they contributed to that jackpot. Each of the 46 lotteries has rules in regards to unclaimed prizes; most Mega Millions members set aside unclaimed winnings for educational purposes.

In 2007, a $31 million prize went unclaimed in New York. Many prizes of $250,000 each have been unclaimed, including several in Michigan for 2007 drawings.

Mega Millions winners have either 180 days (California nonjackpot prizes only) or one year to claim prizes, including the jackpot (although some Mega Millions winners lose the right to collect a jackpot in cash if they wait more than 60 days after the drawing).

The minimum age to purchase a Mega Millions ticket is 18, except in Arizona, Iowa, Louisiana, and Mississippi, where the minimum age is 21; in Nebraska, it is 19. Generally (an exception is Virginia), minors can win on tickets received as gifts; the rules according to each Mega Millions member vary for minors receiving prizes.

Rules vary according to the applicable laws and regulations in the jurisdiction where the ticket is sold, and the winner's residence (e.g., if New Jerseyans win on a ticket bought near their workplace in Manhattan). Mega Millions winnings are exempt from state income tax in California, while Florida, New Hampshire, South Dakota, Tennessee, Texas, Washington, and Wyoming do not have an income tax. Some residents of New York City and Yonkers, New York, pay three levels of income tax, as these cities levy income taxes.

Drawings
Drawings are usually held at the studios of WSB-TV in Atlanta, Georgia. The original host was WSB's chief meteorologist, Glenn Burns. Since 2008, the drawings have been emceed by the hosts of the Georgia Lottery drawings, actor John Crow, Atlanta radio host Carol Blackmon and Adrian Whitford.  Crow usually begins each drawing with “Let’s see if I can make you a millionaire tonight.” or “Let’s see you can win some money!” and signs off with "Play on, America!" Sabrina Cupit served as the secondary host if neither Crow, Blackmon or Whitford are available. The drawings are audited by Preston, CPA.

Before the January 31, 2010, cross-sell expansion, Mega Millions was the only multi-jurisdictional lottery whose drawings were carried nationally, instead of airing only on stations in participating jurisdictions. Chicago-based cable superstation WGN-TV simulcast Mega Millions drawings on its national WGN America feed immediately following WGN's 9:00 p.m. Central Time newscast. Following the cross-sell expansion, WGN also began airing Powerball drawings nationally. WGN served as a default carrier of both major games where no local television station carried either multi-jurisdictional lottery's drawings. Both drawings were removed from WGN America in late 2014 when it ceased carrying WGN's newscasts.

Two machines are used in each Mega Millions drawing. The model used for Mega Millions is the Criterion II, manufactured by Smartplay International of Edgewater Park, New Jersey. The balls are moved around by means of counter-rotating arms which randomly mix the balls. Individually, the five white balls, several seconds apart, drop through a hole in the bottom of the mixing drum.

Record jackpots (listed by cash value)

Revenue
Approximately 50% of Mega Millions sales is returned to players as prizes; the remainder is split (each lottery has different rules regarding these funds) among retailers, marketing, and operations, as well as the 46 jurisdictions offering the game; different lotteries use the proceeds in different ways.

Miscellany

In the aftermath of the attack on the World Trade Center on September 11, 2001, the legislature in Albany, fearing a monumental loss of revenue, passed legislation the following month, which was signed by Governor George Pataki, which included joining a multi-jurisdictional lottery game. Around the same time, for entirely different reasons, Ohio's governor also gave the green light to joining a multi-jurisdictional game. Both lotteries opted to join The Big Game, which, at the time, was offered in seven states. The added populations of the two new jurisdictions, in turn, led to a larger double matrix. The first machine continued to hold white 52 balls, while 16 gold balls were added in the second, meaning there were 52 numbers to pick from in both parts of each $1 game. On May 15, 2002, the game was renamed The Big Game Mega Millions; shortly after, it became just Mega Millions. Except for the 2010 cross-selling expansion, this was the only time The Big Game or Mega Millions simultaneously added more than one member.

In 2005, Mega Millions was the target of a mailing scam. A letter bearing the Mega Millions logo was used in a string of lottery scams designed to trick people into providing personal financial information by cashing bogus checks. The letter, which had been sent to people in several states via standard mail, included a check for what the scammers said was an unclaimed Mega Millions prize. If the check was cashed, it bounced, but not before the bank stamped it with a routing number and personal account information and sent it back to the fraudulent organization, providing them with the recipients' financial information.

A budget impasse due to the 2006 New Jersey Government shutdown led to the temporary closing of its non-essential agencies on July 1, 2006. Among the casualties were the Atlantic City casinos and the New Jersey Lottery. Not only were New Jersey's in-house games (such as Pick-6) not drawn for about a week, but all New Jersey lottery terminals were shut down, meaning Mega Millions could not be played in New Jersey, even though Mega Millions was drawn as usual. A similar shutdown happened in Minnesota on July 1, 2011.

Elecia Battle made national headlines in January 2004 when she claimed that she had lost the winning ticket in the December 30, 2003, Mega Millions drawing. She then filed a lawsuit against the woman who had come forward with the ticket, Rebecca Jemison. Several days later, when confronted with contradictory evidence, she admitted that she had lied. Battle was charged with filing a false police report the following day. As a result of this false report, she was fined $1,000, ordered to perform 50 hours of community service, and required to compensate the police and courts for various costs incurred.

The January 4, 2011 Mega Millions drawing drew attention for its similarity to "The Numbers," a sequence of six numbers that served as a plot device of the ABC drama series Lost. One such usage involved character Hugo "Hurley" Reyes playing the sequence in a similar "Mega Lotto" game, winning a nine-figure jackpot and subsequently experiencing numerous misfortunes in his personal life. The first three numbers (4, 8, 15) and mega ball (42) in the Mega Millions drawing matched the first three numbers and the final number (which Hurley also used as the "mega ball" number) in the Lost sequence. The last two numbers in the Mega Millions drawing did not match the last two numbers that were used in the scene. Those who played "The Numbers", including from quick-picks, won $150 ($118 in California) in a non-Megaplier game; $600 with the multiplier.

The 12 original (before the 2010 cross-sell expansion) Mega Millions members have each produced at least one Mega Millions jackpot winner.

See also 
 Lottery jackpot records
 Powerball

Notes

External links

Telemarketing and Telephone Services: Prizes & Sweepstakes on U.S. Federal Trade Commission website
New Spin On Sweepstakes Scams on U.S. Federal Trade Commission website

Georgia Lottery
Lottery games in the United States
Lottery monopolies
Mega Ball lottery games
1996 introductions
1996 in Georgia (U.S. state)